Kristen Buckley (born June 9, 1968, in New York City, New York) is an American screenwriter and author. She co-wrote the screenplays for 102 Dalmatians (for which she also co-wrote the story), How to Lose a Guy in 10 Days, and Shoe Addicts Anonymous. She also wrote The Parker Grey Show (a novel) and Tramps Like Us (a memoir).

External links

References

Living people
1968 births
American women screenwriters
American women novelists
American memoirists
American women memoirists
Writers from New York City
20th-century American non-fiction writers
20th-century American women writers
21st-century American non-fiction writers
21st-century American women writers
Novelists from New York (state)
Screenwriters from New York (state)